Amphilius opisthophthalmus is a species of catfish in the genus Amphilius. It is found in Oshwe on the Lukenie River in the Democratic Republic of the Congo. Its length reaches .

References

Fish described in 1919
Taxa named by George Albert Boulenger
Amphilius
Freshwater fish of Central Africa